Upper West may refer to:

Places 
 Upper West Province, Western Australia
 Upper West Pubnico, Nova Scotia, Canada
 Upper West Region, in Ghana
 Upper West Side, New York City
 Upper West Side, Buffalo, New York, United States

Other 
 Success Academy Upper West, part of Success Academy Charter Schools
 Upper West Side Story, TV show
 Upper West Akim, parliamentary constituency in West Akim District of Eastern Region of Ghana